Nina Arianda Matijcio (born September 18, 1984) is an American actress. She won the 2012 Tony Award for Best Actress in a Play for her performance as Vanda Jordan in Venus in Fur, and she was nominated for the 2011 Tony Award for Best Actress in a Play for portraying Billie Dawn in Born Yesterday. She stars in Amazon Studios legal series Goliath and starred in the biographical film Stan & Ollie (2018) as Stan Laurel's wife Ida.

Early life and education
Arianda was born on September 18, 1984 in Manhattan, New York. Her parents were born in Germany to Ukrainian families. She grew up in Clifton, New Jersey, and Heidelberg, Germany. She earned a Bachelor of Arts at Eugene Lang College The New School for Liberal Arts and a Master of Fine Arts at New York University's Tisch School of the Arts Graduate Acting Program in 2009.

Career
Arianda made her Broadway debut in April 2011 in the lead role of Billie Dawn in the Broadway production of Born Yesterday, with James Belushi and Robert Sean Leonard. She appeared Off-Broadway as Vanda Jourdain in the comedy-drama play Venus in Fur in 2010. The play then transferred to the Samuel J. Friedman Theatre on Broadway in early November 2011, and her performance received critical acclaim.

She starred in the Manhattan Theatre Club's production of Tales From Red Vienna in 2014. She has appeared in several films including Win Win, Tower Heist, Midnight in Paris, Rob the Mob, and The Disappearance of Eleanor Rigby. She was cast in January 2015 for Hannibal season 3 as Molly, the wife of Will Graham (played by her former Broadway co-star Hugh Dancy).

Arianda starred in Fool for Love at the Williamstown Theatre Festival in July 2014 with Sam Rockwell, directed by Daniel Aukin. Arianda and Rockwell reprised their roles on Broadway at the Samuel J. Friedman Theatre in 2015. Arianda played Agnes Stark in the film Florence Foster Jenkins (2016) and appeared in the film Stan & Ollie (2018) as Ida Kitaeva, the wife of comedian Stan Laurel.

Arianda co-starred in all four seasons of the series Goliath from 2016 - 2021, as well as in the third and fourth seasons of Billions.

In 2019, she appeared with Sam Rockwell in the Clint Eastwood film Richard Jewell.

Filmography

Film

Television

Stage

Awards and nominations

References

External links
 
 
  (archive)
 

1984 births
Living people
21st-century American actresses
Actresses from New York City
Actresses from New Jersey
American film actresses
American people of Ukrainian descent
American people of German descent
American stage actresses
American television actresses
Clarence Derwent Award winners
People from Clifton, New Jersey
Actors from Heidelberg
People from Manhattan
Tisch School of the Arts alumni
The New School alumni
Theatre World Award winners
Tony Award winners